Paul Andrew Masnick (born April 14, 1931) is a Canadian retired ice hockey forward. He played in the National Hockey League between 1950 and 1958.

Playing career
Masnick started his National Hockey League career with the Montreal Canadiens in 1951. He also played for the Toronto Maple Leafs and Chicago Black Hawks. He left the NHL after the 1957–58 season. He retired from hockey in 1963. He won the Stanley Cup in 1953 with Montreal.

Masnick scored 18 goals in NHL regular-season games and four goals in Stanley Cup games.

Masnick is the last surviving member of Canadiens 1953 Stanley Cup team.

Career statistics

Regular season and playoffs

Awards and achievements
Stanley Cup Championship (1953)

External links
 

1931 births
Living people
Canadian ice hockey centres
Chicago Blackhawks players
Cincinnati Mohawks (AHL) players
Ice hockey people from Saskatchewan
Montreal Canadiens players
Montreal Royals (QSHL) players
Regina Pats players
Rochester Americans players
St. Paul Saints (IHL) players
Saskatoon Quakers players
Sportspeople from Regina, Saskatchewan
Stanley Cup champions
Toronto Maple Leafs players
Vancouver Canucks (WHL) players
Winnipeg Warriors (minor pro) players